The Devil You Know is the sixth studio album by American punk rock band The Coathangers. It was released on March 8, 2019, on Suicide Squeeze Records, and is available as a digital download, on CD, cassette and three different kinds of colored vinyl (one only available at live shows).

Track listing

Personnel
The Coathangers
 Julia Kugel-Montoya (Crook Kid Coathanger) – guitar, vocals
 Meredith Franco (Minnie Coathanger) – bass, vocals
 Stephanie Luke (Rusty Coathanger) – drums, vocals

Additional personnel
 Ian Franco – Saxophone on "Memories"
 Nic Jodoin – Engineer, producer, mixing
 Travis Pavur – Additional engineering
 Yochanan Austin – Additional engineering
 Joe Laporta – Mastering
 Matt Odom – Photos, design
 Scott Montoya – Design

Charts

References

The Coathangers albums
Suicide Squeeze Records albums
2019 albums